Vavrečka is a village and municipality in Námestovo District in the Žilina Region of northern Slovakia.

History
In historical records the village was first mentioned in 1600.

Geography
It has a population of about 1,290.

Villages and municipalities in Námestovo District